Henri de Bailly (died October 1637) was a French composer. Originally a singer in the chapelle royale of Henri IV, he was elevated to Surintendant de la musique in 1622 by Louis XIII, and at the same time raised to the nobility.

Bailly was known for diminutions on airs by Guédron, Boësset and Moulinié. His own surviving works consist of only three airs preserved in tablatures by Gabriel Bataille (printed by Ballard, 1614): 
 Reyne je ne puis endurer, que mes feux soyent au mespris d'une folle. 
 Quelque chose que l'Amour puisse, il me tient pour mere nourrice.
 Spanish air - Yo soy la locura, la que sola infundo

References

1637 deaths
Year of birth unknown
French male classical composers
French Baroque composers
Place of birth unknown
17th-century classical composers
17th-century French composers
17th-century male musicians